Rakovec is a village in the municipality of Bogovinje, North Macedonia.

History
According to the 1467-68 Ottoman defter, Rakovec appears as being largely inhabited by an Orthodox Christian Albanian population. Due to Slavicisation, some families had a mixed Slav-Albanian anthroponomy - usually a Slavic first name and an Albanian last name or last names with Albanian patronyms and Slavic suffixes. 

The names are: Koj-o, son of Gjon; Tano, siromah (poor); Nik-o, the son of Petr-o-; Gjon, brother of Gjur-o; Atmaxha, his son; Gjuro, son of Pavl; Bajo-Pejo, son of Gjon; Koja, son of Gjon; Nikolla, son of Petro; Gjuro, son of Pavl; Nikolla, son of Gjurgji.

Demographics
As of the 2021 census, Rakovec had 577 residents with the following ethnic composition:
Albanians 548
Persons for whom data are taken from administrative sources 29

According to the 2002 census, the village had a total of 811 inhabitants. Ethnic groups in the village include:

Albanians 807
Others 4

References

External links

Villages in Bogovinje Municipality
Albanian communities in North Macedonia